The endurance runabout open event at the 2018 Asian Games took place on 25–26 August 2018 at Ancol Beach, Jakarta, Indonesia.

Schedule
All times are Western Indonesia Time (UTC+07:00)

Results
Legend
DNR — Did not race

References

External links 
Jet ski at the 2018 Asian Games – Endurance runabout open

Endurance runabout open